Lisa Catherine Evans (born 21 May 1992) is a Scottish professional footballer who plays for West Ham United in the FA WSL, the top-tier for women's football in England, and for the Scotland national team. She previously played club football for Glasgow City in her native country, and for Turbine Potsdam and FC Bayern Munich in Germany's Frauen-Bundesliga, winning the domestic league title in all three nations.

Early life
Born in Perth, to Richard and Kate, Evans played as a youth with local team St Johnstone Girls (where she played alongside future international teammate Lana Clelland).

Club career

Glasgow City (2008–2012)
Evans joined Scottish Women's Premier League (SWPL) powerhouse side Glasgow City in August 2008. She originally started to play for the club's reserve team which won the second division with a 100% record, making her first team debut in 2009. Evans was also among the first scholarship recipients to the Scottish FA's National Women's Football Academy at the University of Stirling.  Evans studied Sports Science.

During her time at Glasgow City, the club won the Scottish Women's Premier League four times (2009 to 2012), the SWPL Cup twice (2009, 2012) and the Scottish Women's Cup three times (2009, 2011 and 2012). Evans also won the Glasgow City 2011 Young Player of the Year award. She was part of the Glasgow side which reached the last sixteen stage of the UEFA Women's Champions League for the first time. Evans left Glasgow having scored 46 goals in 39 regular season games.

Turbine Potsdam (2012–2015)
In February 2012, German Frauen-Bundesliga champions Turbine Potsdam invited Evans for a trial, after spotting her in their 17–0 UEFA Women's Champions League aggregate win over Glasgow City. On 12 June 2012, it was revealed that she had signed a professional contract with Potsdam. In December 2012 Evans's contract was extended by a further two years; at the time of the extension, Turbine's veteran coach Bernd Schröder described being impressed by the start Evans had made: "It means we're able to secure the long-term services of a player who has developed a lot over the last few weeks and months. Lisa has fitted in really well to the philosophy of the club as a footballer and as a person, and is an enormous benefit to the team." During her first year at Potsdam in 2012–13, Evans was part of a team that was runner-up in both the league and the DFB-Pokal Frauen, and they were Pokal finalists again in 2014–15. She left Potsdam having played 41 regular season games, scoring 7 goals in the process.

Bayern Munich (2015–2017)

In April 2015, Evans announced that she had signed a three-year contract with Turbine's Frauen-Bundesliga rivals FC Bayern Munich, to begin the following season. Evans went on to win the 2015–16 Frauen-Bundesliga with Bayern, as well as finishing runners-up the following year. The team also reached the Round of 32 in the 2015–16 UEFA Women's Champions League and the quarter-finals of the 2016–17 UEFA Women's Champions League. During her time at Bayern, Evans made 32 regular season appearances, scoring twice.

Arsenal (2017–2022)
On 29 June 2017, Evans signed for Arsenal. Due to injuries and competition for places in her usual playing position, coach Joe Montemurro sometimes deployed Evans as a full-back: "One week I find myself on the left wing and then the other I find myself at right-back but it's something I've really enjoyed. It's made me an all-around better player." She extended her contract with the FA WSL club in December 2018. During her first season with Arsenal in 2017–18, Evans played 18 regular season games, scoring two goals, went on to win the WSL Cup and was a Women's FA Cup finalist. Her second season with the club saw her play another 18 regular season games and help Arsenal to a runner-up position in the WSL Cup and finish as champions in the FA WSL. Evans played her 50th match with the club overall on 31 March 2019 against Birmingham City W.F.C.; Arsenal won the game 1–0 and as a result qualified for the Champions League for the first time since 2014.

On 12 September 2019, Evans scored in the first-leg of a Champions League tie against Fiorentina.

On 26 September 2020, Evans scored a hat-trick in the FA Cup against North London rivals Tottenham Hotspur.

Loan to West Ham United 
Evans moved on loan to West Ham United in August 2021.

West Ham United (2022–Present) 
Evans signed for West Ham United permanently on 17 June 2022.

International career

Evans made her debut with the Scottish national team against Wales in October 2011. In February 2012 Evans scored her first international goal in a 5–1 friendly win over Northern Ireland in Belfast. She was part of the squad which narrowly failed to qualify for the UEFA Women's Euro 2013 with a late defeat in the qualification play-off.

Evans scored three goals for Scotland during UEFA qualifying for the 2015 FIFA Women's World Cup. Scotland finished second in their qualifying group and advanced to the UEFA play-offs where they were eliminated by the Netherlands.

In 2017, Scotland qualified for the European Championship for the first time ever. Evans was named to the Scotland squad for Euro 2017 and appeared in all three group games. This was followed by qualifying directly for the 2019 FIFA Women's World Cup after winning their group. Evans was selected for the Scottish world cup squad on 15 May 2019.

In Scotland's opening World Cup match against rivals England, Evans provided the assist to Claire Emslie, who scored Scotland's first World Cup goal.

International goals
Scores and results list Scotland's goal tally first.

Scottish FA Girls Soccer Centres
The Scottish FA launched dedicated Girls' Soccer Centres across Scotland in 2017 before the Euros, to leverage the success of the Scotland national team to increase participation in football among primary school-aged girls across Scotland. Evans was appointed as an ambassador for the East Region covering Angus, Dundee, Fife, and her hometown area of Perth & Kinross.

Personal life 
Evans was in a relationship with former Arsenal, Bayern Munich teammate and Dutch international, Vivianne Miedema, for six years.

In November 2021 Evans joined the charity movement Common Goal, committing 1% of her salary to community organisations working with young people. Evans said she and Miedema "want to be happy and constructive human beings off the pitch. Common Goal is the perfect platform to create change through football in a collective, sustainable way."

In 2021 on the We Play Strong Channel she said that she was studying part-time in Sport, Health and Fitness via an online course.

We Play Strong
Evans is one of UEFA's official ambassadors for #WePlayStrong, a social media and vlogging campaign which was launched in 2018. The campaign's  "...aim is to promote women's football as much as we can and to make people aware of women's football, really," Evans explains. "The ultimate goal is to make football the most played sport by females by 2020. So it's a UEFA initiative to get more women and girls playing football, whether they want to be professional or not." The series, which also originally included professional footballers Sarah Zadrazil, Eunice Beckmann, Laura Feiersinger and now also includes Petronella Ekroth, Shanice van de Sanden and Beth Mead, follows the daily lives of female professional footballers.

Honours
Glasgow City 
Scottish Women's Premier League: 2009, 2010, 2011, 2012
Scottish Women's Cup: 2009, 2011, 2012
Scottish Women's Premier League Cup: 2009, 2012

Bayern Munich
 Bundesliga: 2015–16

Arsenal
 FA WSL: 2018–19
 FA Women's League Cup: 2018

References

External links

Turbine Potsdam club profile

1992 births
Living people
Scottish women's footballers
Scotland women's international footballers
Glasgow City F.C. players
Expatriate women's footballers in Germany
1. FFC Turbine Potsdam players
Footballers from Perth, Scotland
Scottish expatriate sportspeople in Germany
FC Bayern Munich (women) players
Women's association football wingers
Scottish expatriate women's footballers
Scottish people of Welsh descent
Arsenal W.F.C. players
West Ham United F.C. Women players
Women's Super League players
Frauen-Bundesliga players
2019 FIFA Women's World Cup players
LGBT association football players
Scottish LGBT sportspeople
Lesbian sportswomen
Association footballers' wives and girlfriends
UEFA Women's Euro 2017 players